The Isotta Fraschini Gamma was an air cooled aircraft engine developed by the Italian engineering company Isotta Fraschini in the 1930s. Produced in small numbers for one-off aircraft, including the Ambrosini SAI.107 and Caproni Vizzola F.5 Gamma fighter trainer prototypes, it was developed into the more powerful and more numerous Delta.

Design and development
The Gamma was an air cooled inverted V engine with 12 cylinders arranged in two banks, each cylinder of bore  and stroke .

The engine formed the basis for a number of other aircraft engines produced by the company. The more powerful Delta was developed as a larger complement to the Gamma. While the Beta straight-six engine was essentially one half of the engine, the Zeta mated two Gamma engines to a common crankshaft to create an X24 engine. The larger engines shared with the Gamma a problem cooling the rearmost cylinders which impeded development.

Variants
Gamma R.C.15  at 
Gamma R.C.35  at

Applications

 Ambrosini SAI.107
 Caproni Vizzola F.5 Gamma
 Savoia-Marchetti SM.86

Specifications

See also

References

Notes

Bibliography

 
 
 
 
 
 
 

Air-cooled aircraft piston engines
1930s aircraft piston engines
Inverted V12 aircraft engines
Gamma